Karl Skerlan (3 January 1940 – 7 February 2017) was an Austrian football player, playing for Austria between 1958 and 1964. He also played for club teams including Wiener Sport-Club, Admira Energie Wien, FK Pirmasens, FC Höchst, SC Kittsee and SW Bregenz.

Team Management 

Skerlan managed FC Vorarlberg (FC Rätia Bludenz) between Dec 1, 1973 and Jun 30, 1975. He managed the team for 576 days, running a W/D/L of 2/1/4. He used 28 players during his time managing the team. This was the only management he performed during his career.

External links

1940 births
2017 deaths
Austrian footballers
Austria international footballers
Association football forwards
Wiener Sport-Club players
FC Admira Wacker Mödling players
SW Bregenz players
FK Pirmasens players